FC Pari Nizhny Novgorod or FC Pari NN for short is a Russian football club from Nizhny Novgorod, founded in 2015. It made its debut in the Russian Premier League in the 2021–22 season.

History
The club has been known under different names:
2015–2016: FC Volga-Olimpiyets Nizhny Novgorod
2016–2018: FC Olimpiyets Nizhny Novgorod
2018–2022: FC Nizhny Novgorod
Since 2022: FC Pari Nizhny Novgorod

In the 2015–16 season, it began to play in the third-tier Russian Professional Football League. It was founded as a farm club for FC Volga Nizhny Novgorod. On 15 June 2016, the parent club Volga was dissolved, with Olimpiyets becoming the top club in Nizhny Novgorod. At the end of the 2016–17, Olimpiyets won their PFL zone and were promoted to the second-level Russian Football National League. At the end of the 2018–19 season, they qualified for the Russian Premier League promotion play-offs, but lost to PFC Krylia Sovetov Samara with an aggregate score of 2–3.

In the 2020–21 season, the club finished 3rd in FNL. As the second-placed club FC Orenburg failed to receive a Premier League license due to issues with their stadium, Nizhny Novgorod was promoted to the RPL for the very first time for the 2021–22 season.

Former Nigeria striker Sylvester Igboun suspended his contract with the team because of the 2022 Russia invasion of Ukraine.

On 10 June 2022, the club announced that the name of the club will be changed to FC Pari Nizhny Novgorod (or Pari NN for short) due to a sponsorship deal with a bookmaker Pari, previously known as Paribet. The name change was approved by the Russian Football Union on the same day.

League

Current squad
As of 22 February 2023, according to the RPL website.

Out on loan

Club Officials

References

External links
  Team history by footballfacts

 
Association football clubs established in 2015
Football clubs in Russia
Sport in Nizhny Novgorod
2015 establishments in Russia